Sailors Don't Care is a 1940 British comedy film directed by Oswald Mitchell and starring Michael Wilding, Edward Rigby and Jean Gillie. The film follows the antics of some River Patrol Service men on the trail of some spies.

Partial cast
 Tom Gamble as Nobby Clark
 Edward Rigby as Joe Clark
 Jean Gillie as Nancy
 Michael Wilding as Dick
 Marion Gerth as Mimi
 Mavis Villiers as Blondie
 G. H. Mulcaster as Admiral Reynolds
 John Salew as Henri
 Henry B. Longhurst as Admiral Drake
 Dennis Wyndham as Captain Raleigh

References

External links

1940 films
1940 comedy films
British comedy films
Films based on works by W. W. Jacobs
British black-and-white films
Films set in England
Films shot at Nettlefold Studios
British World War II films
Films directed by Oswald Mitchell
Films scored by Percival Mackey
1940s English-language films
1940s British films